Lucun may refer to the following locations in China:

 Lucun, Jieshou (芦村镇), town in Anhui
 Lucun, Jiangxi (芦村镇), town in Yuanzhou District, Yichun
 Lucun, Shandong (鲁村镇), town in Yiyuan County
 Lucun Township (卢村乡), Guangde County, Anhui